Awhina Tangen-Wainohu (born 16 December 1997) is a New Zealand rugby union player. She plays for New Zealand at international level and was a member of their 2021 Rugby World Cup champion squad. She also plays for Chiefs Manawa in the Super Rugby Aupiki competition and represents Waikato provincially.

Rugby career

2021 
Tangen-Wainohu was named in the Chiefs team that played the Blues women in the first-ever women's super rugby match at Eden Park on 1 May 2021. She was later selected for the Chiefs Manawa squad for the inaugural 2022 Super Rugby Aupiki season.

2022 
On August, Tangen-Wainohu was named in the Black Ferns squad for the Laurie O’Reilly Cup Test series. She made her international debut for New Zealand on 20 August against Australia at the Orangetheory Stadium in Christchurch.

Tangen-Wainohu was also selected for the 32-player squad to the delayed 2021 Rugby World Cup. She scored her first try against the Wallaroos in the opening match of the World Cup.

References

External links
Awhina Tangen-Wainohu at AllBlacks.com

1997 births
Living people
New Zealand female rugby union players